is a former Japanese football player.

He generally plays from a central position as a defensively minded midfielder.

Club statistics

References

External links

1984 births
Living people
Ryutsu Keizai University alumni
Association football people from Osaka Prefecture
Japanese footballers
J1 League players
J2 League players
Japan Football League players
Kashiwa Reysol players
Avispa Fukuoka players
Zweigen Kanazawa players
FC Machida Zelvia players
Association football midfielders